Childless is a 2008 American drama film written and directed by Charlie Levi and starring Barbara Hershey, Joe Mantegna, James Naughton and Diane Venora.

The sudden passing of a teenage girl unsettles the four adults in her life. Jarred by this glimpse of mortality, they struggle to understand – or justify – the current state of their own lives.  As each gets ready for the funeral, they speak their private thoughts directly to the camera, leaving it up to the viewer to make sense of these off-kilter, self-serving, yet frequently humorous accounts of the family story. By the end of the day, more than a teenager has been put to rest. Hope beckons.

Cast
Barbara Hershey as Natalie
Joe Mantegna as Richard
Diane Venora as Mary
James Naughton as Harvey
Natalie Dreyfuss as Katherine
Jordan Baker as Edith

Accolade
The film won the Visionary Award at the Boston Film Festival.

References

External links
 
 

American drama films
2008 drama films
2008 films
2000s English-language films
2000s American films